

This is a list of the National Register of Historic Places listings in Berks County, Pennsylvania.

This is intended to be a complete list of the properties and districts on National Register of Historic Places in Berks County, Pennsylvania, United States. The locations of National Register properties and districts for which the latitude and longitude coordinates are included below, may be seen in a map.

There are 140 properties and districts listed on the National Register in the county. Two sites are further designated a National Historic Landmark and another is a National Historic Site.

Current listings

|}

Former listing

|}

See also 

 List of National Historic Landmarks in Pennsylvania
 National Register of Historic Places listings in Pennsylvania
 List of Pennsylvania state historical markers in Berks County

References 

Berks County
History of Berks County, Pennsylvania